The Royal Swedish Air Force Materiel Administration (abbreviated KFF) was a Swedish government agency active between the years 1936 and 1968. The agency was amalgamated into the Swedish Defence Materiel Administration.

History
The Royal Swedish Air Force Materiel Administration was established on 1 July 1936 with the task in technical and economic terms to exercise top management and oversight of the Swedish Air Force. The agency was first organized in the Materiel Department (1936–1954), Commissariat Department (1936–1954), Building Department (1936–1948, was merged with the exception of the Airfield Department (Flygfältsbyrån) into the Fortifications Administration) and the Civil Office (1936–1954). In 1948 the Airfield Department (1948–1963) became an own unit, and in 1952/1953 so did the Central Planning (to 1963) and the Personnel Office (until 1954).

A reorganization on 1 July 1954 established, in addition to the Airfield Department and the Central Planning, the following units: Aircraft Department (1954–1968), Electro Department (1954–1968), Maintenance Department (1954–1968), Purchasing Department (1954–1968), Commissariat Bureau (1954–1963, merge into the Quartermaster Administration of the Swedish Armed Forces), Normaliebyrån (1954–1968), Administrative Office (1954–1968) and the Material Inspection (1954–1960).

A special sub-unit within the Materiel Department for missiles, the Missile Defence Agency (Försvarets robotvapenbyrå), became in 1954 Robotbyrån within the Air Force Materiel Administration, in 1963 renamed to the Missile Department (Robotavdelningen) (shared by the Swedish defence as of 1962). In 1960, the creation of the Director-General of Engineering of the [Royal] Swedish Air Force (flygöverdirektören), who took over, among others thing, the tasks of the Material Inspection. The Air Force Materiel Administration was amalgamated on 1 July 1968 into the Swedish Defence Materiel Administration.

Vice Chiefs
1936–1942: Arthur Örnberg
1942–1944: John Stenbeck
1944–1950: Nils Söderberg
1950–1957: Bengt Jacobsson
1957–1960: Torsten Rapp
1960–1961: Lage Thunberg
1961–1963: Greger Falk

See also
Royal Swedish Army Materiel Administration
Royal Swedish Naval Materiel Administration

References

Swedish Air Force
Defunct government agencies of Sweden
Government agencies established in 1936
Government agencies disestablished in 1968
1936 establishments in Sweden
1968 disestablishments in Sweden